Clinical Obstetrics and Gynecology is a quarterly peer-reviewed medical journal covering obstetrics and gynecology. It was established in 1958 and is published by Lippincott Williams & Wilkins. The editor-in-chief is James R. Scott (University of Utah School of Medicine). According to the Journal Citation Reports, the journal has a 2015 impact factor of 1.619, ranking it 51st out of 80 journals in the category "Obstetrics & Gynecology".

References

External links

Obstetrics and gynaecology journals
Lippincott Williams & Wilkins academic journals
Publications established in 1958
Quarterly journals
English-language journals